Canadian International may refer to:

Canadian International (badminton), a badminton tournament
Canadian International Stakes, a stakes race